The James Autocycle was a  two-stroke, autocycle manufactured by the James Cycle Co from 1946 to 1953. 

A pre-World War II design, the autocycle continued in production until late 1953 with a Villiers Engineering Junior De Luxe 98cc engine in a typical autocycle frame. The bike was available in Deluxe and Superlux models.

Deluxe
The James Deluxe Autocycle was manufactured from 1946 to 1949 and has a  engine fed with a Villiers Junior carburettor and driven by one gear and a clutch. The frame was a single downtube and rigid frame. The front fork is a central undamped spring. Original tyres were Dunlop Carrier 26 inch by 2 inch (oversized) and rims are Dunlop WMO 36 hole in a silver argenized color. The drive train was chain and sprocket. Braking was through front and rear four inch drum brakes. Lighting provided by a six volt lamp on the front and four volt for the tail light.

Superlux
The James Superlux Autocycle was manufactured from 1950 to 1953. The frame was a single tube rigid type, front fork was like that of the Deluxe. Tyres were 21 x 2.35 inches, rims were the colour the same as the Deluxe. Drive train, braking and lighting were identical to the Deluxe.

See also
List of James motorcycles
List of motorcycles of the 1940s
List of motorcycles of the 1950s

References
James Motorcycles Information Website
James Motorcycle Website - resources and manuals

Autocycle
Motorcycles introduced in the 1940s